Galeopsis segetum, commonly known as downy hemp-nettle,  is a species of flowering plant in the sage family, Lamiaceae. It grows as a weed in arable ground throughout Europe.   Although superficially resembling the stinging nettle it is of a different family and does not sting.

References

External links

segetum
Flora of Europe
Plants described in 1770
Taxa named by Noël Martin Joseph de Necker